The canton of Saint-Malo-2 is an administrative division of the Ille-et-Vilaine department, in northwestern France. It was created at the French canton reorganisation which came into effect in March 2015. Its seat is in Saint-Malo.

It consists of the following communes: 
Dinard 
Le Minihic-sur-Rance
Pleurtuit
La Richardais
Saint-Briac-sur-Mer
Saint-Jouan-des-Guérets
Saint-Lunaire
Saint-Malo (partly)

References

Cantons of Ille-et-Vilaine